Amber D (born 1982) is a British hard dance DJ from Staffordshire. As Amber D’Amour she plays electro, fidget, and tech house.

She has been a DJ since late 2001. Her first residency was at the legendary Golden, in Hanley Stoke-on-Trent, where she used to warm up for DJs such as Tiesto, Armin Van Buuren, K-Klass, Mauro Picotto, and she then DJ'd on BPM Radio and at BPM parties. In 2002, she won a DJ Competition at Fluffy, and started a residency at the club. She has released records with dance labels such as Tidy Trax, Kiddfectious, and Riot!, and has DJ'd internationally, including in Ibiza. She did an Essential Mix live on BBC Radio 1 in 2005. She was “Mixmag Future Hero” in 2004, and one of her tracks was in the top 4 at the Hard Dance Awards 2008. She also had the biggest selling EP of all time on Tidy Trax in the shape of the Amber D EP that got released in 2008. She now runs five record labels, D'Amour Recordings (electro house), D-Day Recordings (Tech, Euro Hard Trance and Hardstyle), D'Licious Recordings (UK Hard House & Hard Dance), D'Licious HARD (Nu NRG and Harder House), and DirtyByDeisgn (Deep House / Tech House).

Amber is one of the most versatile DJs, playing everything from Old Skool 90's Dance, House, Tech House, Techno Electro, Jackin' House under her guise Amber D'Amour. Under her Amber D guise, she mainly plays Hard House, Hard Dance, Hard Trance, Hardstyle and Schranz.

She trained as a classical pianist and has a BTEC National Diploma in Music Technology and is currently studying at University. She married Lee Haslam, another DJ, in August 2008, but they since divorced.  She continues to DJ in 2020, mainly on Twitch www.twitch.tv/DjAmber_D and is also an ambassador for mental health, doing regular livestreams talking and connecting with her fans, in highly entertaining streams.

She is also a Radio Presenter at LDC Radio [Leeds Dance Community Radio] and her show is every Friday 23:00 - 01:00.

References

External links

D'Amour Recordings

Slinky FM biography

Living people
English DJs
Musicians from Staffordshire
1982 births
Electronic dance music DJs